Pseudocolaspis sericea is a species of leaf beetle of Tanzania and the Democratic Republic of the Congo. It was first described from Dar es Salaam by Julius Weise in 1910.

References

Eumolpinae
Beetles of the Democratic Republic of the Congo
Beetles described in 1910
Taxa named by Julius Weise
Insects of Tanzania